KORC may refer to:

 KORC-LP, a low-power radio station (105.9 FM) licensed to serve Corvallis, Oregon, United States
 KZHC-FM, a radio station (92.7 FM) licensed to serve Burns, Oregon, which held the call signs KORC-FM and KORC from 2010 to 2017
 KWDP, a radio station (820 AM) licensed to serve Waldport, Oregon, which held the call sign KORC from 1991 to 2011
 KVTT, a radio station (1110 AM) licensed to serve Mineral Wells, Texas, United States, which held the call sign KORC from 1947 to 1981